The Out of Home Advertising Association of America (OAAA) is a trade association representing all out of home (OOH) media formats in the United States.

About 

Founded in 1891, OAAA regulates industry member standards covering both digital and static out-of-home advertising. OAAA provides its members with current government regulations, marketing innovations and overall OOH standard operations. There are five main OAAA membership categories: General, Street Furniture/Transit/Place-Based, Associate, Affiliate, and International.

OAAA's archives are located at Duke University.

Award programs 

OAAA annually hosts two awards programs recognizing media planning and OOH creative work. The OOH Media Plan Awards program recognizes exceptional media planning in the creation and execution of an OOH campaign. The OAAA OBIE Awards celebrates the best creative OOH over several product categories and formats.

References

1891 establishments in the United States
Organizations established in 1891
Advertising trade associations
Trade associations based in the United States
Organizations based in Washington, D.C.